Reign is a historical fantasy television series created by Laurie McCarthy and Stephanie Sengupta   which premiered on October 17, 2013 on The CW. The series stars Adelaide Kane in the role of Mary, Queen of Scots, depicting her early life in France until her return to Scotland.  The series finale aired on June 16, 2017.

Series overview

Episodes

Season 1 (2013–14)

Season 2 (2014–15)

Season 3 (2015–16)

Season 4 (2017)

Ratings

References

External links
 
 

Lists of American drama television series episodes
Lists of Canadian drama television series episodes